Hard Fists is a 1927 American silent Western film directed by William Wyler and starring Art Acord, Louise Lorraine and Gilbert Holmes.

The film's sets were designed by the art director David S. Garber.

Plot

Cast
 Art Acord as Art Alvord 
 Louise Lorraine as Betty Barnes 
 Gilbert Holmes as Jed Leach 
 Albert J. Smith as Charles Crane

References

External links
 

1927 films
1927 Western (genre) films
American black-and-white films
Films directed by William Wyler
Universal Pictures films
Silent American Western (genre) films
Films with screenplays by George H. Plympton
1920s English-language films
1920s American films